Presidential helicopter may refer to:

 Agrupación Aérea Presidencial helicopter, used to transport the President of Argentina
 Avion Presidente Juarez, the Mexican presidential helicopter
 Brazilian Presidential Helicopter, used to transport the President of Brazil
 Marine One, the call sign of a U.S. Marine Corps aircraft when carrying the President of the United States
 Presidential helicopter (South Korea), the Republic of Korea Air Force Helicopter used to transport the President of South Korea